Ernest Alfred Dalton (17 August 1885 – 12 April 1963) was a Canadian fencer. He competed at the 1932 and 1936 Summer Olympics.

References

1885 births
1963 deaths
Canadian male fencers
Olympic fencers of Canada
Fencers at the 1932 Summer Olympics
Fencers at the 1936 Summer Olympics
Sportspeople from Toronto